Kaalapani is a 1996 Indian Malayalam-language epic historical drama film co-written and directed by Priyadarshan. Set in 1915, the film focuses on the lives of Indian independence activists incarcerated in the Cellular Jail (or Kālā Pānī) in Andaman and Nicobar Islands during the British Raj. The ensemble cast includes Mohanlal, Prabhu, Tabu, Amrish Puri, Nedumudi Venu, Sreenivasan, Tinnu Anand, Annu Kapoor, Alex Draper, Sankaradi, and Vineeth. The film was produced by Mohanlal for Pranavam Arts in association with R. Mohan's Shogun Films.

The film is about the lives of prisoners in British India who are brought to Kālā Pānī. The name Kalapani is derived from the mode of imprisonment in British India. Ilaiyaraaja composed the music, the cinematography was by Santosh Sivan, and the editing by N. Gopalakrishnan. The film introduced Dolby Stereo into Malayalam cinema. It was made on a budget of 2.50 crore, making it the costliest Malayalam film made until then.

Kaalapani was released on 6 April 1996 in 450 theaters worldwide, which was the largest release for any Indian film until then. The film is now regarded as one of the classics in Malayalam cinema. Originally made in Malayalam, the film was dubbed and released in Hindi as Saza-E-Kala Pani, Tamil as Siraichalai, and in Telugu as Kaala Pani. Amitabh Bachchan bought the Hindi dubbing rights, besides narrating the prologue for the Hindi version. The film won four National Film Awards, including the awards for Best Art Direction (Sabu Cyril), Best Special Effects (S. T. Venky), and Best Cinematography (Santosh Sivan). The movie also won seven Kerala State Film Awards.

Plot
In 1965, G. S. Sethu (Vineeth) of the Indian Army goes to Ross Island, Kaalapani to find the whereabouts of his aunt Parvathi's (Tabu) husband Govardhan Menon (Mohanlal), who has been sent to jail in 1916 during the period of British rule. In an old room containing record of prisoners held at the jail, Sethu comes across Govardhan's records and learns his story.

Govardhan, a doctor and Indian nationalist, is wrongly accused of bombing a train carrying 55 people, including British officials. On his wedding day with Parvathi, he is deported to a cellular jail at Port Blair, Andaman and Nicobar Islands. There, hundreds of Indian prisoners are incarcerated in the cellular jail, including leading participants of the independence movement.

David Berry (Alex Draper) is a sadistic jailor who is of Irish descent, while Len Hutton (John Kolvenbach) is a kindhearted English doctor. Savarkar (Annu Kapoor) is incarcerated and tries his best to keep the spirit of the prisoners going despite unbelievable torture.

Parvathi keeps waiting for Govardhan to come back. Due to Len's efforts, the government decides to investigate the matter of the torture meted out to the prisoners. 14 people are ordered to be released. One of them is Mukundan (Prabhu), Govardhan's friend. David and the jail warden Mirza Khan (Amrish Puri) hatch a plan to incite a prison riot and shoot down 13 prisoners while they are escaping. Mukundan refuses to escape and is taken on the pretext of meeting the Chief Commissioner, and is shot and killed. Seeing Mukundan's dead body, Govardhan throws down David from one of the towers and kills Mirza Khan by strangling him. Govardhan is hanged to death.

All this is shown in intermittent flashbacks. Sethu, after knowing Govardhan has already been hanged to death 45 years ago, decides to not tell the truth to his aunt as her wait of 50 years would have been in vain. The film ends with Sethu lying to her that he met Govardhan and talked to him about her, indicating she will never come to know about Govardhan's death and will keep waiting for him for the rest of her life.

Cast

 Mohanlal as Dr. Govardhan Menon / Unni
 Prabhu as Mukundan Iyengar, a revolutionary who wanted avenge British officer Barrington for killing locals.
 Tabu as Parvathi / Parvathikutty, Dr.Govardhan's lover and later wife
 Amrish Puri as Jailer Mirza Khan, an Afghan jailer who is a companion of David Barry.
 Vineeth as G. Sethu, Dr.Govardhan's nephew who is in the Indian Army 
 Alex Draper as Jailer David Barry, a sadist and cruel jailer in Kalapani.
 John Kolvenbach as Dr. Len Hutton, a kind-hearted doctor.
 Annu Kapoor as Savarkar
 Sankaradi as Kunju Muhammad Musaliar, an influential Muslim prisoner who always tries to unite all Hindu and Muslim prisoners  
 Nedumudi Venu as Sreekandan Nair, Govardhan's maternal uncle, who was a local chieftain and a loyalist to the British Rule
 Delhi Ganesh as Pandiyan, a prisoner who have done many nationalistic activities who attempted to escape from prison, later he were sentenced to death.
 Sreenivasan as Moosa a.k.a. Kanaran, a prisoner and a spy of Mirza Khan
 Cochin Haneefa as Ahmed Kutty, a kind hearted and patriot guard in the jail
 Maniyanpilla Raju as Nair, an official in the Andaman & Nicobar administration of independent India
 Tinnu Anand as Ram Lakhan, a prisoner
 Govind Menon as Parmanand, a prisoner
 S.R. Veeraraghavan as Achyuthan, a prisoner
 Sreenath as Satyasheelan, a Prisoner
 Ajayan Adoor as a Prisoner
 Suma Jayaram as Sreekandan Nair's daughter, who was jealous of Parvathi falling in love with Govardhan
 Tom Alter as British Chief Commissioner of the Andaman and Nicobar Islands Province
 Kozhikode Narayanan Nair as Naanu Nair, Parvathi's father and Sreekandan Nair's assistant
 Poojappura Ravi as Nampoothiri, who wanted to marry Parvathi
 Antony Perumbavoor as Mukundan's friend and accomplice 
 Kanya Bharathi as Mukundan's sister

Production

Development

Director Priyadarshan co-wrote the screenplay with screenwriter, T. Damodaran. The basis for the story were existing accounts of life in cellular jail, particularly excerpts from biographies of political leaders of the Indian Independence Movement. Most of these excerpts covered the ruthless routine of prisoners in jail, under the command of Jailer David Barry, Major James Pattinson Walker and Petty officer Mirza Khan.

Pre-production
While the Pre-World War I ports were recreated on the Andaman Islands, several huge sets were built on a 1.5 acres space in Murugalaya Studio, Chennai to replicate the Cellular Jail. In Madras, the sets of Cellular Jail cost about Rs 12 lakh to build on 1.5 acres at the Murugalaya Studio. Apparently, director Priyadarshan was adamant and determined to be faithful to the details of the era. He says: "The Andamans had not seen a horse in 20 years. We had to carry four horses there at a cost of about Rs 3 lakh. When the filming was over, we presented them to the Andamans administration." Prior to the making of the film, Prabhu had broken his knee and during his recovery phase, put on considerable weight. In order to accommodate his physique into the script, Priyadarshan altered the character to make him eat constantly in the film.

Filming

The budget of the film, was much larger than the average 1 crore for a Malayalam film at the time. The shooting was completed in 72 days at Andaman and Nicobar Islands, several parts of Kerala and Chennai. Post production took more than four months to complete. Composer Ilaiyaraaja completed his symphonic score in 16 days; audiographer Deepan Chatterji completed the sound design and mix in 90 days. This is the first Malayalam film to recorded in Dolby Stereo.

The film is shot in the Malayalam language. However, numerous portions contain dialogues in Hindi, English, Tamil, Bengali, Telugu, and German.

Soundtrack

The music was composed and conducted by Ilaiyaraaja. K. S. Chithra was the only female singer in all the versions, while male singers kept changing from version to version.

Track list

Accolades
National Film Awards 1995
 Best Art Direction – Sabu Cyril
 Best Cinematography – Santosh Sivan
 Best Audiography – Deepan Chatterji
 Best Special Effects – S. T. Venky

Kerala State Film Awards
 Second Best Film  – Mohanlal (producer), R.Mohan (co-producer)
 Best Actor – Mohanlal
 Best Cinematography - Santosh Sivan
 Best Art Director  – Sabu Cyril
 Best Music Director  – Ilaiyaraaja
 Best Processing Lab – Gemini Colour Lab
 Best Costume Designer – Sajin Raghavan

References

External links
 

1996 films
1990s Malayalam-language films
Films set in the Indian independence movement
Films with screenplays by T. Damodaran
Films set in 1916
Films set in 1965
Indian prison films
Films whose cinematographer won the Best Cinematography National Film Award
Films scored by Ilaiyaraaja
Pranavam Arts International films
Films set in Kerala
Films whose production designer won the Best Production Design National Film Award
Films that won the Best Audiography National Film Award
Films that won the Best Special Effects National Film Award
Films set in the British Raj
Memorials to Vinayak Damodar Savarkar
Films set in the Andaman and Nicobar Islands